Small Island Indian Reserve No. 4, a.k.a. Small Island 4, is an Indian reserve of the Tlowitsis Nation located on Small Island in Beware Passage, south of Turnour Island, east of Harbledown Island, and west of West Cracroft Island.

See also
List of Indian reserves in British Columbia

References

Indian reserves in British Columbia
Kwakwaka'wakw
Central Coast of British Columbia